ELEKS, also known as ELEKS Software, is an international company that provides custom software engineering and consulting services, headquartered in Tallinn, Estonia. The company has about 2000+ employees and operates offices in the United States, Canada, Germany, Ukraine, Poland, Switzerland, Japan, Croatia, UAE, KSA and the United Kingdom.

History
Eleks was established as a product company in 1991 by Oleksiy Skrypnyk and his son Oleksiy Skrypnyk, Jr. The company started out with the launch of Dakar, a science-intensive software for power distribution systems for Eastern European markets.

By 2016, Dakar was used in more than 20 Eastern European power systems, and by 2019, the company had 1400 employees. As of 2019, more than 200 companies are using services of  the company.

Industries and technologies
Eleks provides its services to enterprises in Finance, Media & Entertainment, Healthcare, Retail, Agriculture and Logistics industries.

Activities include:
Custom Software Development
 Advanced Analytics
Virtual Reality
 Drones
 Mobile and Wearables Development
 Solutions for Retail
Data Science
Research and innovations

The company supports Ukrainian armed forces with developing military drone software and hardware.

References

Companies based in Lviv
Software companies established in 1991
Consulting firms established in 1991
Development software companies
Engineering software companies
Information technology consulting firms
Outsourcing companies
Software companies of Ukraine
Ukrainian brands